Campodolcino (Candulscin in Chiavennasque dialect) is a comune (municipality) in the Province of Sondrio in the Italian region Lombardy, located about  north of Milan and about  northwest of Sondrio, on the border with Switzerland.

The municipality of Campodolcino contains the frazioni (subdivisions, mainly villages and hamlets) Fraciscio, Motta (the site of the Shrine of Our Lady of Europe), Strarleggia and Tini.

Campodolcino borders the following municipalities: Madesimo, Mesocco (Switzerland), Piuro, San Giacomo Filippo.

Demographic evolution

References

External links
 www.comune.campodolcino.so.it/
 www.prolococampodolcino.it/
 www.sanluigiguanella.it/

Cities and towns in Lombardy
Valle Spluga